Lautertal may refer to the following places in Germany: 

Lautertal, Bavaria, a municipality in the district of Coburg, Bavaria
Lautertal (Odenwald), a municipality in Bergstraße district, Hesse
Lautertal (Vogelsberg), a municipality in Vogelsbergkreis, Hesse